Georgios Skoutarides (1885 – 1962) was a Greek athlete.  He competed at the 1906 Intercalated Games in Athens and at the 1908 Summer Olympics in London. In 1906 he was eliminated in the first round of the 110 metre hurdles competition. Two years later Skoutarides ran in the first heat of the 100 metres, placing second to Edward Duffy and not advancing to the semifinals. He also participated in the 110 metre hurdles event where he was also eliminated in the first round.

References

Sources
 
 
 Biography of Georgios Skoutarides  

Greek male hurdlers
Greek male sprinters
Olympic athletes of Greece
Athletes (track and field) at the 1906 Intercalated Games
Athletes (track and field) at the 1908 Summer Olympics
1885 births
1962 deaths
20th-century Greek people